This page lists the table tennis events for 2016.

 December 30, 2015 – December 18, 2016: 2016 ITTF Events Calendar

2016 Summer Olympics (ITTF)
 August 6–17: 2016 Summer Olympics in  Rio de Janeiro at the Riocentro
 Men's singles:   Ma Long;   Zhang Jike;   Jun Mizutani
 Women's singles:   Ding Ning;   Li Xiaoxia;   Kim Song-i
 Men's team:  ;  ;  
 Women's team:  ;  ;

Table tennis World Cups & Championships
 February 28 – March 6: 2016 World Team Table Tennis Championships in  Kuala Lumpur
 Men's team winners: 
 Women's team winners: 
 October 1–3: 2016 Men's World Cup in  Saarbrücken
 Winner:  Fan Zhendong
 October 7–9: 2016 Women's World Cup in  Philadelphia
 Winner:  Miu Hirano
 October 21–29: 2016 ITTF World Cadet Challenge in  Shanghai
 Cadet boys' singles winner:  CHO Dae-seong
 Cadet girls' singles winner:  Miyuu Kihara
 Cadet boys' doubles winners:  Maciej Kolodziejczyk /  Vladimir Sidorenko
 Cadet girls' doubles winners:  HUANG Yingqi /  RYU Han-na
 Cadet mixed doubles winners:  CHO Dae-seong /  Amy Wang
 November 30 – December 7: 2016 World Junior Table Tennis Championships in  Cape Town
 Junior boys' team winners: 
 Junior girls' team winners:

Continental table tennis championships
 February 1–7: 2016 Latin American Table Tennis Championships in  San Juan, Puerto Rico
 Men's singles winner:  Hugo Calderano
 Women's singles winner:  Lin Gui
 Men's U21 singles winner:  Brian Afanador
 Women's U21 singles winner:  Adriana Díaz
 Men's doubles winners:  Gaston Alto / Pablo Tabachnik
 Women's doubles winners:  Gremlis Arvelo / Neridee Nino
 Mixed doubles winners:  Vitor Ishiy / Caroline Kumahara
 February 5–7: 2016 Europe TOP 16 Cup in  Gondomar, Portugal
 Men's singles winner:  Dimitrij Ovtcharov
 Women's singles winner:  Shen Yanfei
 February 14–15: 2016 Africa TOP 16 Cup in  Khartoum
 Men's singles winner:  Quadri Aruna
 Women's singles winner:  Dina Meshref
 March 20–24: 2016 Oceania Table Tennis Championships in  Bendigo
 Men's singles winner:  Chris Yan
 Women's singles winner:  Jian Fang Lay
 Men's doubles winners:  Choy Freddy /  Yoshua Shing
 Women's doubles winners:  (Natalie Paterson, RAO Ruofei)
 Mixed doubles winners:  (LIN Yi-Sien, RAO Ruofei)
 April 6–12: 2016 African Junior & Cadet Table Tennis Championships in  Algiers
 Junior boys' singles winner:  Youssef Abdel-Aziz
 Junior girls' singles winner:  Amira Yousry
 Cadet boys' singles winner:  Marwan Abdelwahab
 Cadet girls' singles winner:  Rinad Fathy
 Junior boys' doubles winners:  Youssef Abdel-Aziz / Karim Elhakem
 Junior girls' doubles winners:  Mariam Alhodaby / Amira Yousry
 Junior mixed doubles winners:  Youssef Abdel-Aziz / Mariam Alhodaby
 April 9–10: 2016 Oceania Junior Table Tennis Championships in  Tweed Heads, New South Wales
 Boys' junior singles winner:  Benjamin Gould
 Girls' junior singles winner:  Holly Nicholas
 Boys' cadet singles winner:  Zhao Yanglun
 Girls' cadet singles winner:  Vong Hui Ling
 Boys' junior team winners: 
 Girls' junior team winners: 
 Boys' cadet team winners: 
 Girls' cadet team winners: 
 April 28–30: 2016 Asian Cup Table Tennis Tournament in  Dubai
 Men's singles winner:  Xu Xin
 Women's singles winner:  Liu Shiwen
 June 3–5: 2016 Latin American Cup Table Tennis Tournament in  Guatemala City
 Men's singles winner:  Hugo Calderano
 Women's singles winner:  Lady Ruano
 June 13–14: 2016 ITTF-Oceania Cup in  Melbourne
 Men's singles winner:  David Powell
 Women's singles winner:  Zhenhua Dederko
 June 24: 2016 North America Cup Table Tennis Tournament in  Burnaby
 Men's singles winner:  FENG Yijun
 Women's singles winner:  WU Yue
 June 25–30: 2016 Pan American Junior Table Tennis Championships in  Burnaby
 Boys' junior singles winner:  Kanak Jha
 Girls' junior singles winner:  Adriana Diaz
 Boys' junior doubles winners:  Horacio Cifuentes / Francisco Sanchi
 Girls' junior doubles winners:  Leticia Nakada / Bruna Takahashi
 Junior mixed doubles winners:  Yomar Gonzalez / Adriana Diaz
 Boys' junior team winners: 
 Girls' junior team winners: 
 July 8–17: 2016 Table Tennis European Youth Championships in  Zagreb
 Junior boys' singles winner:  Alexandre Cassin
 Junior boys' doubles winners:  Tobias Hippler / Nils Hohmeier
 Junior girls' singles winner:  Adina Diaconu
 Junior girls' doubles winners:  Lisa Lung / Eline Loyen
 Cadet boys' singles winner:  Vladimir Sidorenko
 Cadet boys' team winners:  Maciej Kolodziejczyk /  Vladislav Ursu
 Cadet girls' singles winner:  Maria Tailakova
 Cadet girls' team winners:  Tania Plaian /  Ekaterina Zironova
 September 10: 2016 North America Table Tennis Team Championships in  Milpitas, California
 Note: The only teams that competed here are Canada and the United States.
 Men's team: The  defeated , 3–1, in matches played.
 Women's team: The  defeated , 3–2, in matches played.
 September 16–21: 2016 Asian Junior & Cadet Table Tennis Championships in  Bangkok
 Junior boys' singles winner:  XU Haidong
 Junior boys' doubles winners:  KIM Song Gun / HAM Yu Song
 Junior girls' singles winner:  QIAN Tianyi
 Junior girls' doubles winners:  Minnie Wai-Yam Soo / MAK Tze Wing
 Junior mixed doubles winners:  CAO Wei / SHI Xunyao
 Cadet boys' singles winner:  NIU Guankai
 Cadet girls' singles winner:  SHI Xunyao
 October 7–9: 2016 Europe Youth Top 10 in  Prague
 Junior boys' singles winner:  Tomáš Polansky
 Junior girls' singles winner:  Audrey Zarif
 Cadet boys' singles winner:  Truls Moregard
 Cadet girls' singles winner:  Anastasia Kolish
 October 18–23: 2016 European Table Tennis Championships in  Budapest
 Men's singles winner:  Emmanuel Lebesson
 Women's singles winner:  Melek Hu
 Men's doubles winners:  Patrick Franziska /  Jonathan Groth
 Women's doubles winners:  Kristin Silbereisen / Sabine Winter
 Mixed doubles winners:  João Monteiro /  Daniela Dodean
 October 24–30: 2016 African Table Tennis Championships in  Agadir
 Men's singles winner:  Omar Assar
 Women's singles winner:  Olufunke Oshonaike
 Men's doubles winners:  Quadri Aruna / Segun Toriola
 Women's doubles winners:  Yousra Abdel Razek / Dina Meshref
 Mixed doubles winners:  Omar Assar / Dina Meshref

2016 ITTF World Tour
 January 20–24:  Hungarian Open in Budapest
 Men's singles:  Chuang Chih-yuan
 Women's singles:  Tie Ya Na
 Men's doubles:  Chuang Chih-yuan / HUANG Sheng-Sheng
 Women's doubles:  JEON Ji-hee / Yang Ha-eun
 January 27–31:  German Open in Berlin
 Men's singles:  Ma Long
 Women's singles:  Wu Yang
 Men's doubles:  Masataka Morizono / Yuya Oshima
 Women's doubles:  JEON Ji-hee / Yang Ha-eun
 February 10–14:  Open in Manila
 Event cancelled.
 March 16–20:  Kuwait Open in Kuwait City
 Men's singles:  Zhang Jike
 Women's singles:  Li Xiaoxia
 Men's doubles:  Xu Xin / Zhang Jike
 Women's doubles:  Ding Ning / Liu Shiwen
 March 23–27:  Qatar Open in Doha
 Men's singles:  Ma Long
 Women's singles:  Liu Shiwen
 Men's doubles:  Fan Zhendong / Zhang Jike
 Women's doubles:  Ding Ning / Liu Shiwen
 April 5–9:  Open in Santiago
 Men's singles:  Antoine Hachard
 Women's singles:  Rachel Moret
 Men's doubles:  Antoine Hachard / Romain Ruiz
 Women's doubles:  Maria Lorenzotti /  Candela Molero (default)
 April 20–24:  Polish Open in Warsaw
 Men's singles:  Jun Mizutani
 Women's singles:  Miu Hirano
 Men's doubles:  Masataka Morizono / Yuya Oshima
 Women's doubles:  JEON Ji-hee / Yang Ha-eun
 May 18–22:  Open in Lagos
 Men's singles:  Benedek Olah
 Women's singles:  Jieni Shao
 Men's doubles:  Andrey Bukin / Vasilij Filatov
 Women's doubles:  Irina Ermakova / Olga Kulikova
 May 24–28:  Open in Zagreb
 Men's singles:  Joo Sae-hyuk
 Women's singles:  Hitomi Satō
 Men's doubles:  Patrick Franziska /  Jonathan Groth
 Women's doubles:  Doo Hoi Kem / LEE Ho Ching
 June 1–5:  Open in Otočec
 Men's singles:  Jun Mizutani
 Women's singles:  Feng Tianwei
 Men's doubles:  HO Kwan Kit / Wong Chun Ting
 Women's doubles:  Maria Dolgikh / Polina Mikhailova
 June 8–12:  Australian Open in Melbourne
 Men's singles:  Jun Mizutani
 Women's singles:  Hina Hayata
 Men's doubles:  Takuya Jin / Yuki Morita
 Women's doubles:  Honoka Hashimoto / Hitomi Satō
 June 15–19:  Japan Open in Tokyo
 Men's singles:  Fan Zhendong
 Women's singles:  Liu Shiwen
 Men's doubles:  Ma Long / Xu Xin
 Women's doubles:  Ding Ning / Li Xiaoxia
 June 22–26:  Korea Open in Incheon
 Men's singles:  Xu Xin
 Women's singles:  Ding Ning 
 Men's doubles:  Xu Xin / Zhang Jike
 Women's doubles:  Ding Ning / Liu Shiwen
 June 29 – July 3:  Open in Pyongyang
 Men's singles:  KANG Wi Hun
 Women's singles:  KIM Song I
 Men's doubles:  Cao Wei / XU Yingbin
 Women's doubles:  KIM Song I / Ri Myong-sun
 August 24–28:  Open in Panagyurishte
 Men's singles:  Tomáš Konečný
 Women's singles:  Yuka Ishigaki
 Men's doubles:  Alexey Liventsov / Mikhail Paikov
 Women's doubles:  Miyu Kato / Misaki Morizono
 August 31 – September 4:  Czech Open in Olomouc
 Men's singles:  Yuto Muramatsu
 Women's singles:  YANG Xiaoxin
 Men's doubles:  CHO Eon-rae / PARK Jeong-woo
 Women's doubles:  Matilda Ekholm /  Georgina Póta
 September 7–11:  Open in Minsk
 Men's singles:  JANG Woo-jin
 Women's singles:  Saki Shibata
 Men's doubles:  JANG Woo-jin / LIM Jong-hoon
 Women's doubles:  Honoka Hashimoto / Hitomi Satō
 September 14–18:  China Open in Chengdu
 Men's singles:  Fan Zhendong
 Women's singles:  Ding Ning
 Men's doubles:  Ma Long / Zhang Jike
 Women's doubles:  Chen Meng / Zhu Yuling
 September 20–24:  Open in De Haan
 Men's singles:  Sathiyan Gnanasekaran
 Women's singles:  Georgina Póta
 Men's doubles:  Alexey Liventsov / Mikhail Paikov
 Women's doubles:  Georgina Póta /  Yulia Prokhorova
 November 9–13:  Austrian Open in Linz
 Men's singles:  Kenta Matsudaira
 Women's singles:  Mima Ito
 Men's doubles:  Patrick Franziska /  Jonathan Groth
 Women's doubles:  Honoka Hashimoto / Hitomi Satō
 November 15–20:  Swedish Open in Stockholm
 Men's singles:  Yuya Oshima
 Women's singles:  Kasumi Ishikawa
 Men's doubles:  Hugo Calderano / Gustavo Tsuboi
 Women's doubles:  Cheng I-ching / Lee I-Chen
 December 8–11: 2016 ITTF World Tour Grand Finals in  Doha
 Men's singles:  Ma Long
 Women's singles:  Zhu Yuling
 Men's doubles:  Jung Young-sik / Lee Sang-su
 Women's doubles:  Yui Hamamoto / Hina Hayata

References

 
Table tennis by year